Laura Flessel-Colovic (born 6 November 1971) is a French politician and épée fencer who served as Minister of Sports from 2017 to 2018. Born in Pointe-à-Pitre, Guadeloupe, she has won the most Olympic medals of any French sportswoman, with five. Before 2007, she was a member of the Levallois Sporting Club Escrime, and now works with Lagardère Paris Racing. She is married and has one daughter.

She was France's flag-bearer at the 2012 Summer Olympics opening ceremony in London, which was her fifth and last Olympics.

She was appointed Minister of Sports in the Philippe Government on 17 May 2017 and resigned on 4 September 2018.

Sporting career

Fencer

Laura Flessel began fencing at age six and quickly became a very talented fencer. She progressed quickly and became champion of Guadeloupe. Then, she gained solid experience on the Caribbean, Central American and Pan American circuits, winning in 1990 the Pan American Championships in foil and épée. The same year, she joined the metropolis, to train with the Racing Club de France. She also trains within the INSEP, which allows her to face the best French fencers.

She won her first world stage success in 1995, finishing in third place at the Hague World Championships. This bronze medal is accompanied by a silver medal in the team event, which was defeated 45 to 44 by Hungary. Her teammates were Valérie Barlois, Sophie Moressee and Sangita Tripathi.

After her gold medal at the 1996 Summer Olympics and her victory at 1998 World Cup, she became the eighth French fencer, and first woman, to win the Olympic and World Champion titles. She is one of the favorites for the 2000 Summer Olympics title. She finally fails in the semi-final against Timea Nagy. At the 2006 World Championships in Turin, she gets a new individual bronze medal, beaten again by Timea Nagy

The 2008 Summer Olympics, her fourth Olympic Games, marks a turning point as it is the first Olympics where she does not get a medal after being eliminated by Li Na (15-9) in the quarter-finals. The year 2009 sees again Laura Flessel at the top but still without success with a third place at the European Championships in Plovdiv and a failure at the World Championships in Antalya where she lost f in quarter final against Lyubov Shutova after a close match that ends in sudden death on the score of 7 to 8.

On 21 April 2012, she qualifies for the individual event of the London Olympics by defeating Emma Samuelsson in the semifinals of the European Zone Qualifying Championship in Bratislava. On 14 May 2012, Laura Flessel is officially designated flag bearer of the French delegation for the London Olympics. In her final competition, she defeated Courtney Hurley (15-12) before losing to Simona Gherman (No. 4 worldwide) 15–13. She ends her career at the age of 40.

Controversy

Laura Flessel was banned for three months in 2002 after failing a doping test. She tested positive for the banned substance coramine glucose, blaming the French team doctors for giving her a drug that is available over the counter in France.

Sports management

In 2012, she took over the management of Nathalie Moellhausen, a native of Italy and competing under the colors of Brazil, forming a group also composed of two fencing masters, Daniel Levavasseur and Michel Sicard, the latter having both coached Flessel.

Sports consultant and other activities

Media and television

In 2008, Laura Flessel was a columnist for the daily newspaper Aujourd'hui Sport.

She was a contestant on the third season of Danse avec les stars.

During the 2016 Summer Olympics she commented, on Canal +, the opening ceremony with Stéphane Guy and Joris Sabi, the fencing events with Frédéric Roullier and the closing ceremony with Julien Fébreau and Jean Galfione.

Community life

She is ambassador of the AMREF Flying Doctors' Stand Up for African Mothers campaign, the godmother of Handicap International, and Ambassador of Plan France. His long-term project is to bring fencing to disadvantaged cities and places. She is also a goodwill ambassador for UNESCO where she promotes tolerance in sports.

She founded the association Ti'Colibri which aims to promote fencing. Thanks to its action, it has been able to offer means and equipment to clubs with few resources.

Political career

During the two-rounds of the French presidential election of 2017, she was one of the sixty active or retired sportsmen who signed a call to vote for Emmanuel Macron on 7 May 2017 in the second round of the presidential election "so that sport remains an area of freedom, equality and fraternity."

On 17 May 2017, she was appointed Minister of Sports in the First Philippe government, under the presidency of Emmanuel Macron, a position she held in the Second Philippe government, which was formed on 21 June 2017.

The government's second most popular minister at the end of 2017, she is notably responsible for preparing the organization of the 2024 Summer Olympics. At the beginning of 2018, she launched a campaign against discrimination in the sporting world, with as ambassadors Antoine Griezmann, Estelle Mossely, Marie-Amélie Le Fur, Frédéric Michalak, Emmeline Ndongue and Florent Manaudou.

Honours 

 Summer Olympics
 Gold Medal in individual épée in 1996
 Gold Medal in team épée in 1996
 Silver Medal in individual épée in 2004
 Bronze Medal in individual épée in 2000
 Bronze Medal in team épée in 2004
 World Championships
 Gold Medal in individual épée in 1998
 Gold Medal in team épée in 1998
 Gold Medal in individual épée in 1999
 Gold Medal in team épée in 2005
 Gold Medal in team épée in 2008
 Silver Medal in team épée in 1995
 Silver Medal in individual épée in 2001
 Silver Medal in team épée in 2006
 Bronze Medal in individual épée in 1995
 Bronze Medal in team épée in 1997
 Bronze Medal in individual épée in 2005
 Bronze Medal in individual épée in 2006
 World Cup Fencing
 World Cup winner individual épée in 2002, 2003 and 2004
 World Cup runner-up individual épée in 1997

References

External links 

 "Laura Flessel-Colovic", Time, 11 September 2000
 "Laura Flessel-Colovic", n°30 on Time's list of "100 Olympic Athletes To Watch" (2008)

1971 births
French female foil fencers
French female épée fencers
Fencers at the 1996 Summer Olympics
Fencers at the 2000 Summer Olympics
Fencers at the 2004 Summer Olympics
Fencers at the 2008 Summer Olympics
Fencers at the 2012 Summer Olympics
Olympic fencers of France
Olympic gold medalists for France
Olympic silver medalists for France
Olympic bronze medalists for France
Living people
Guadeloupean female épée fencers
French people of Guadeloupean descent
Olympic medalists in fencing
Medalists at the 1996 Summer Olympics
Medalists at the 2000 Summer Olympics
Medalists at the 2004 Summer Olympics
European champions for France
Women government ministers of France
Mediterranean Games silver medalists for France
Competitors at the 2005 Mediterranean Games
21st-century French politicians
21st-century French women politicians
Black French sportspeople
Mediterranean Games medalists in fencing
Black French politicians
Guadeloupean female foil fencers